Paulian Banu (born 21 October 2000) is a Romanian professional footballer who plays as a midfielder for Liga II club Viitorul Târgu Jiu.

References

External links
 

2000 births
Living people
Sportspeople from Ploiești
Romanian footballers
Association football midfielders
Liga I players
Liga II players
Liga III players
FC Astra Giurgiu players
FC Metaloglobus București players
ACS Viitorul Târgu Jiu players